Borbach Chantry, West Dean, in southeast Wiltshire, England, was built in 1333. It is recorded in the National Heritage List for England as a designated Grade I listed building, and is now a redundant church in the care of the Churches Conservation Trust.  It was declared redundant on 5 October 1971, and was vested in the trust (at that time the Redundant Churches Fund) on 19 January 1973.

The chapel was built of flint with limestone dressings, about 1333 by Robert de Borbach as part of a 14th-century parish church, but is all that remains. When the church was demolished in 1868 the arcade which connected the chapel to the church was walled up and a new south porch added.

The chapel contains a series of monuments, including those to the parliamentarian John Evelyn who died in 1684 and his family. Other memorials are to the Pierrepont family who inherited from him the adjacent manor house, which has since been demolished.

See also
 List of churches preserved by the Churches Conservation Trust in Southwest England

References

14th-century church buildings in England
Buildings and structures completed in 1333
Church of England church buildings in Wiltshire
Grade I listed churches in Wiltshire
Churches preserved by the Churches Conservation Trust